Silverton is an unincorporated community in Jackson County, West Virginia, United States.

An early variant name was Franklin.

References

Unincorporated communities in Jackson County, West Virginia
Unincorporated communities in West Virginia